Karlsruhe is divided into 27 districts.

System 
The city districts are further subdivided into city neighbourhoods (previously sometimes also referred to as city districts).

According to § 15 and 16 of the main statute of the city of Karlsruhe a local council was set up in each of the districts Durlach (with Aue) and Stupferich, Hohenwettersbach, Wolfartsweier, Grötzingen, Neureut and Wettersbach (Grünwettersbach and Palmbach).

List

Sources 

Karlsruhe
City districts in Germany